Fauth is a small double-crater located at the edge of the rough southern ramparts of the prominent ray crater Copernicus on the Moon. It lies in the Mare Insularum, to the northeast of the crater Reinhold. The crater is named after German selenographer Philipp Johann Heinrich Fauth.

This formation is composed of the merged craters Fauth and the slightly smaller Fauth A. The latter craterlet cuts into the southern rim of Fauth, and has a radius of 9.6 kilometers. Fauth is most likely a secondary crater that was created by the formation of Copernicus.

Satellite craters
By convention these features are identified on lunar maps by placing the letter on the side of the crater midpoint that is closest to Fauth.

References

External links

Fauth at The Moon Wiki
 

Impact craters on the Moon